Rapi Sotoa (died 2 February 1970) was an American Samoan chief and politician. He served as President of the Senate between 1958 and 1968.

Biography
A high chief, Sotoa became chairman of the Council of Paramount Chiefs. Prior to entering politics he was a civil servant, starting work as a sanitation inspector in 1949.

In 1958 he became President of the Senate, holding the post for ten years. As a Senator, he was a member of the Constitutional Convention of 1960, and one of the signatories of the constitution. In 1968 he became an assistant to the Governor.

He died on 2 February 1970 in Tutuila.

References

American Samoan chiefs
American Samoan civil servants
American Samoa Senators
1970 deaths